The Dominican Republic participated at the 2003 Pan American Games, held in its capital Santo Domingo, from 1 to 17 August 2003 as the host nation.

Medals

Gold

Men's 400 m hurdles: Félix Sánchez
Women's high jump: Juana Arrendel

Men's middleweight (75 kg): Juan José Ubaldo

Men's Kumite (74 kg): Rubel Salomón
Women's Kumite (+58 kg): Heidy Rodríguez

Men's Singles: Lin Ju

Men's 68 kg: Luis Benítez
Women's +67 kg: Gina María Ruiz

Women's tournament: Dominican Republic

Women's 75 kg: Wanda Rijo

Silver

Men's tournament: Dominican Republic

Men's light welterweight (64 kg): Isidro Mosquea
Men's flyweight (51 kg): Juan Carlos Payano

Men's Kumite (+80 kg): Sterling Felix

Women's Singles: Wu Xue

Men's +80 kg: Rowell Pier Jérez
Women's 57 kg: Dinanyiris Furcal

Men's 56 kg: Tomas Aquino
Women's 48 kg: Guillermina Candelario
Women's 53 kg: Yudelquis Contreras

Bronze

Men's 4 x 400 m relay: Arismendy Peguero, Carlos Santa, Julio Vidal and Félix Sánchez
Women's shot put: Fior Vásquez

Men's featherweight (57 kg): Jhonathan Batista
Men's lightweight (60 kg): Manuel Félix Díaz
Men's welterweight (69 kg): Euris González
Men's light heavyweight (81 kg): Argenis Casimiro Núñez

Dressage individual: Yvonne Losos de Muñiz

Men's Kumite (68 kg): Dionicio Gustavo

Women's Double: Wu Xue - Olga Vila

Men's Double: Lin Ju - Roberto Brito

Men's 58 kg: Gabriel Mercedes
Men's 80 kg: Eddy Antonio Luna

Men's +105 kg: Plaiter Reyes
Women's 53 kg: Wendy Amparo
Women's 69 kg: Miosotis Heredia
Women's +75 kg: María Carvajal

Results by event

Athletics

Track

Road

Field

Heptathlon

Basketball

Men's tournament
José Vargas
Franklin Western
Carlos Payano
Carlos Paniagua
Otto Ramírez
Miguel Angel Pichardo
Amaury Filion
Luis Flores
Jack Michael Martínez
Carlos Morban
Jeffrey Greer
Francisco García
Head coach:
Héctor Báez

Boxing

Swimming

Men's competitions

Women's competitions

Triathlon

Notes

See also
Dominican Republic at the 2004 Summer Olympics

Nations at the 2003 Pan American Games
P
2003